The Standard Oil Red Crown Service Station, at 220 N. Spruce St. in Ogallala, Nebraska, was built in 1922.  It was listed on the National Register of Historic Places in 2004.

It is a small brick building facing diagonally out on a corner lot, onto the main business street of Ogallala (Spruce Street) and 3rd Street.  It was designed by architects John and Alan McDonald.  It has also been known as the Spruce Street Station and later as the Spruce Street Visitors Center.

References

Gas stations on the National Register of Historic Places in Nebraska
National Register of Historic Places in Keith County, Nebraska
Early Commercial architecture in the United States
Buildings and structures completed in 1922